Stigmella freyella is a moth of the family Nepticulidae. It is found from the Netherlands to the Baltic region and Russia, southwards to the Mediterranean region. It is also found in North Africa.

In Central Europe there are two generations per year.

The larvae feed on Calystegia sepium, Calystegia soldanella, Convolvulus althaeoides, Convolvulus arvensis and Convolvulus elegans. They mine the leaves of their host plant. The mine consists of a full depth, very narrow and often strongly wound corridor. The frass is concentrated in a narrow central line.

References

Nepticulidae
Moths described in 1858
Moths of Europe
Moths of Africa